Wan'Dale Robinson (born January 5, 2001) is an American football wide receiver for the New York Giants of the National Football League (NFL). He played college football at Nebraska before transferring to Kentucky.

High school career

Robinson was born on January 5, 2001, in Frankfort, Kentucky. He attended Western Hills High School. Throughout his career, he was versatile on both offense and defense. In total, he played as a safety, linebacker, receiver, quarterback, running back, punt returner, and kickoff returner according to his high school coach. Rated as the No. 87 player in the country by 247Sports.com, he originally committed to Kentucky before committing to Nebraska.

College career

Nebraska

As a freshman at Nebraska, Robinson was used as both a rusher and receiver, rushing for 340 yards on 88 rushes and recording 40 receptions for 453 yards. After the season, he was named a Freshman AllAmerican by The Athletic.

Robinson's role increased in 2020, as he had almost the same amount of scrimmage yards he had in 2019 in two fewer games. He recorded 46 rushes for 240 yards, along with 51 receptions for 461 yards. He was voted honorable mention AllBig Ten by the conference coaches after the season.

Kentucky

On January 11, 2021, Robinson announced that he was entering the transfer portal and leaving Nebraska. Four days later, he committed to Kentucky, where he was once committed to in high school. Robinson was the No. 1 receiver for the team, accumulating 104 receptions, 1,334 yards and 7 touchdown receptions in 13 games. His season total receptions and yards broke single-season school records. Later that year he helped the Wildcats win the Citrus Bowl.

Statistics

Professional career

Robinson was selected by the New York Giants in the second round (43rd overall) of the 2022 NFL Draft. Robinson made his NFL debut in the Giants' 2022 season opener against the Tennessee Titans and opened the season as the team's starting slot receiver, recording one reception for five yards, but suffered a knee injury and was out for the rest of the game. He returned from his injury in Week 6 against the Baltimore Ravens and recorded three receptions for 37 yards and a touchdown as the Giants beat the Ravens 24-20. In Week 7 win against the Jacksonville Jaguars, Robinson recorded 6 catches for 50 yards. In Week 11 loss against the Detroit Lions, Robinson had 9 catches for 100 yards but suffered an ACL tear and was placed on injured reserve.

References

External links
 New York Giants bio
 Kentucky Wildcats bio
 Nebraska Cornhuskers bio

Living people
Players of American football from Kentucky
American football wide receivers
Nebraska Cornhuskers football players
Kentucky Wildcats football players
People from Frankfort, Kentucky
Western Hills High School (Frankfort, Kentucky) alumni
2001 births
New York Giants players